Guillermo Gustavo "Willy" Hernangómez Geuer (born 27 May 1994) is a Spanish professional basketball player for the New Orleans Pelicans of the National Basketball Association (NBA).

Professional career

Real Madrid (2011–2016)
Considered one of the best prospects of Real Madrid, Hernangómez played his first two seasons on its reserve team. In the summer of 2013, Hernangómez was loaned by Real Madrid to Cajasol Sevilla, extending his agreement for one more season in the next summer. On 17 July 2015, he returned to Real Madrid and played for the senior team in 2015–16. In his lone full season for the senior team, he averaged 5.7 points and 3.3 rebounds in 34 games in the Spanish ACB League.

New York Knicks (2016–2018)

Hernangómez declared for the 2015 NBA draft, and was selected with the 35th overall pick by the Philadelphia 76ers. His rights were later traded to the New York Knicks on draft night, in exchange for two future second round draft choices and cash considerations.

On 8 July 2016, Hernangómez signed with the New York Knicks. On 25 October 2016, he made his debut for the Knicks in their season opener, scoring four points in nine minutes off the bench in a 117–88 loss to the Cleveland Cavaliers. On 7 November 2016, he was assigned to the Westchester Knicks, New York's D-League affiliate. He was recalled later that day. Two days later, he had a season-best 14 points in a 110–96 win over the Brooklyn Nets. On 25 January 2017, he had a career-high 16 rebounds in a 103–95 loss to the Dallas Mavericks. On 1 February 2017, he had 16 points and 16 rebounds in a 95–90 win over the Brooklyn Nets. On 15 February, he was named as a replacement on the World Team for the injured Emmanuel Mudiay in 2017 Rising Stars Challenge. On 25 March 2017, he had a career-high 24 points and 13 rebounds in a 106–98 loss to the San Antonio Spurs. On 9 April 2017, he tied his career high with 24 points and grabbed 11 rebounds in a 110–97 loss to the Toronto Raptors. Five days later, he was named Eastern Conference Rookie of the Month for games played in April after leading all Eastern Conference rookies in rebounding (8.5 rpg) and ranked second in scoring (12.5 ppg). At the season's end, he was named to the NBA All-Rookie First Team.

Charlotte Hornets (2018–2020)
On 7 February 2018, Hernangómez was traded to the Charlotte Hornets in exchange for Johnny O'Bryant III and two future second round draft picks.

New Orleans Pelicans (2020–present)
On 30 November 2020, Hernangómez signed with the New Orleans Pelicans. He has become a consistent fan favorite, positive locker room influence, and off the bench contributor.

National team career

Junior national team
As a member of the junior national teams of Spain, Hernangómez played at the 2012 Albert Schweitzer Tournament, where he was named to the All-Tournament Team. He also played at the 2011 FIBA Europe Under-18 Championship, where he won a gold medal, and at the 2014 FIBA Europe Under-20 Championship, where he won a silver medal, and was named to the All-Tournament Team.

Senior national team
He has also been a member of the senior Spain national basketball team. With Spain's senior national team, he played at the EuroBasket 2015, where he won a gold medal, and at the 2016 Summer Olympics, where he won a bronze medal. He also played at the EuroBasket 2017, where he won a bronze medal. In 2019 FIBA World Cup, he won another gold medal.

At EuroBasket 2022, Hernangómez and Spain won a surprising gold medal after defeating France in the final, in which he had 14 points and 8 rebounds. Hernangómez was named the EuroBasket MVP after averaging 17.2 points and 6.9 rebounds over the tournament.

Career statistics

NBA

Regular season

|-
| style="text-align:left;"| 
| style="text-align:left;"| New York
| 72 || 22 || 18.4 || .530 || .267 || .728 || 7.0 || 1.3 || .6 || .5 || 8.2
|-
| style="text-align:left;"| 
| style="text-align:left;"| New York
| 26 || 0 || 9.0 || .605 || .200 || .429 || 2.6 || .8 || .3 || .3 || 4.3
|-
| style="text-align:left;"| 
| style="text-align:left;"| Charlotte
| 22 || 1 || 11.9 || .506 || .571 || .758 || 5.3 || .5 || .5 || .4 || 6.1
|-
| style="text-align:left;"| 
| style="text-align:left;"| Charlotte
| 58 || 3 || 14.0 || .519 || .385 || .694 || 5.4 || 1.0 || .3 || .3 || 7.3
|-
| style="text-align:left;"| 
| style="text-align:left;"| Charlotte
| 31 || 0 || 12.1 || .532 || .227 || .627 || 4.3 || .9 || .3 || .2 || 6.1
|-
| style="text-align:left;"| 
| style="text-align:left;"| New Orleans
| 47 || 12 || 18.0 || .563 || .100 || .667 || 7.1 || 1.1 || .5 || .5 || 7.8
|-
| style="text-align:left;"| 
| style="text-align:left;"| New Orleans
| 50 || 8 || 16.8 || .520 || .333 || .773 || 6.8 || 1.3 || .4 || .4 || 9.1
|- class="sortbottom"
| style="text-align:center;" colspan="2"| Career
| 306 || 46 || 15.3 || .534 || .309 || .702 || 5.9 || 1.1 || .4 || .4 || 7.4

Playoffs

|-
| style="text-align:left;"| 2022
| style="text-align:left;"| New Orleans
| 1 || 0 || 2.0 || .250 || .000 || — || 2.0 || .0 || .0 || .0 || 2.0
|- class="sortbottom"
| style="text-align:center;" colspan="2"|Career
| 1 || 0 || 2.0 || .250 || .000 || — || 2.0 || .0 || .0 || .0 || 2.0

EuroLeague

|-
| style="text-align:left;"| 2012–13
| style="text-align:left;"| Real Madrid
| 3 || 0 || 4.8 || .286 || .000 || .000 || 1.0 || .0 || .0 || .0 || 1.3 || -1.3
|-
| style="text-align:left;"| 2015–16
| style="text-align:left;"| Real Madrid
| 14 || 0 || 11.2 || .643 || .000 || .545 || 3.4 || .3 || .2 || .6 || 4.3 || 5.6
|- class="sortbottom"
| style="text-align:center;" colspan="2"| Career
| 17 || 0 || 10.0 || .592 || .000 || .545 || 2.9 || .2 || .2 || .5 || 3.8 || 4.4

Awards and accomplishments

Club honours
 Liga ACB (Spanish League): 2013, 2016
 Copa del Rey (Spanish Cup): 2016
 Supercopa de España (Spanish Supercup): 2012
 FIBA Intercontinental Cup: 2015

Spain national team
 EuroBasket 2015: 
 2016 Summer Olympics:  Bronze
 EuroBasket 2017: 
 2019 World Cup: 
 EuroBasket 2022:

Individual
 2012 Albert Schweitzer Tournament: All-Tournament Team
 2014 FIBA Europe Under-20 Championship: All-Tournament Team
 EuroCup MVP of the Week (2014–15 Week 8)
 2015 and 2016 ACB All-Young players Team
 2017 NBA All-Rookie First Team
 2022 EuroBasket MVP
 2022 EuroBasket All-Tournament Team

Personal life
Hernangómez is a son of Guillermo Hernangómez Heredero and Margarita "Wonny" Geuer Draeger. His mother Margarita was born in Seville and is of German origin. His brother Juancho Hernangómez is also a professional basketball player; he currently plays with the Toronto Raptors.

References

External links
 
 Willy Hernangómez at acb.com 
 
 Willy Hernangómez at euroleague.net
 Willy Hernangómez at fibaeurope.com
 
 
 
 

1994 births
Living people
2019 FIBA Basketball World Cup players
Basketball players at the 2016 Summer Olympics
Basketball players at the 2020 Summer Olympics
Basketball players from Madrid
Centers (basketball)
Charlotte Hornets players
FIBA EuroBasket-winning players
Liga ACB players
Medalists at the 2016 Summer Olympics
National Basketball Association players from Spain
New Orleans Pelicans players
New York Knicks players
Olympic basketball players of Spain
Olympic bronze medalists for Spain
Olympic medalists in basketball
Philadelphia 76ers draft picks
Real Betis Baloncesto players
Real Madrid Baloncesto players
Spanish expatriate basketball people in the United States
Spanish men's basketball players
Spanish people of German descent
FIBA Basketball World Cup-winning players